Frank Andrew Munsey (August 21, 1854 – December 22, 1925) was an American newspaper and magazine publisher and author. He was born in Mercer, Maine, but spent most of his life in New York City. The village of Munsey Park, New York is named for him, along with the Munsey Building in downtown Baltimore, Maryland at the southeast corner of North Calvert Street and East Fayette Street.

Munsey is credited with the idea of using new high-speed printing presses to print on inexpensive, untrimmed, pulp paper in order to mass-produce affordable (typically ten-cent) magazines. Chiefly filled with various genres of action and adventure fiction, that were aimed at working-class readers who could not afford and were not interested in the content of the 25-cent "slick" magazines of the time. This innovation, known as pulp magazines, became an entire industry unto itself and made Munsey quite wealthy. He often shut down the printing process and changed the content of magazines when they became unprofitable, quickly starting new ones in their place.

Beginnings
Munsey was of English ancestry, his family emigrated from England to America during the colonial era in the early 1600s. Early in life, Munsey ran a general store, at which he failed. He next became a telegraph operator and then manager of the Western Union telegraph office, in Augusta, Maine. Publishing was a formidable industry in Augusta at the time. Munsey was very ambitious, and being in charge of the telegraph office (a vital connection for the news media of his day) gave him a unique insight of the printing business. In 1882 he moved from Augusta to New York City and entered the publishing industry, having used his savings to purchase rights to several stories. He formed a partnership with a friend in New York and an Augusta stockbroker. After arriving in New York, the stockbroker backed out of the agreement and released his friend from any further financial obligations. Approaching a New York publisher, Munsey managed to edit and produce the first issue of his magazine, Golden Argosy, only two months and nine days after his arrival.

However, five months later, the publisher went bankrupt and entered receivership. By placing a claim for his unpaid salary, Munsey was able to take control of the magazine. Borrowing $300 from a friend in Maine, he barely managed to keep the magazine going while learning enough about the publishing industry to eventually succeed.

Publishing 
Munsey was a pioneer in the publication of pulp magazines. He expanded into the newspaper business, eventually owning many publications in the Eastern United States.

After his death in Broward County, the Frank A. Munsey Company continued publishing various magazines, including pulp detective fiction, such as Flynn's Detective Fiction and All-Story Love. In 1942 they sold out to rival pulp publisher Popular Publications.

Magazines
Golden Argosy was a weekly "boys adventure" magazine in a dime novel format with a mix of both articles and fiction. After a few years, Munsey realized that targeting a young audience had been a mistake, as they were hard readers to retain since they rapidly grew out of the publication, and since children of the time had very little spending money, advertisers were not interested in such a publication. In 1888, the name was changed to The Argosy to attract an older audience. In 1894 it became a monthly, designed to complement Munsey's Magazine, and in December 1896 it became the first true pulp, switching to an all-fiction format of 192 pages on seven-by-ten inch untrimmed pulp paper. It was renamed Argosy Magazine, and by 1903, circulation climbed to a half million copies per month.

In 1889 he founded Munsey's Weekly, a 36-page quarto magazine, designed to be "a magazine of the people and for the people, with pictures and art and good cheer and human interest throughout." It was a success, soon selling 40,000 copies per week. In 1891 the magazine became a monthly, Munsey's Magazine, in 1892 the magazine began to include a "complete novel" in every issue, and in 1893 the price was dropped to ten cents per issue. By 1895 circulation was over half a million copies per month, by 1897, 700,000 copies per month. In October 1906, he began publishing Railroad Man's Magazine, the first specialized pulp magazine which featured railroad related stories and articles. It was soon followed by a similar magazine, The Ocean, which featured sea stories and articles. The Ocean debuted with the March 1907 issue; after the January 1908 issue, it changed title and content to the general purpose The Live Wire, which also had a short run.

Newspapers

Munsey was very active in the newspaper industry, at one time or another owning at least 17 publications. As the number of newspapers in America declined, Munsey became known for merging many of his properties; though probably financially wise, this earned him a great deal of enmity from those who worked in the industry. He was known variously as "Executioner of Newspapers", "Dealer in Dailies" and "Undertaker of Journalism". Munsey papers included:
Washington Times – founded 1894 by Rep. Charles G. Conn (1844–1931) of Elkhart, Indiana; later publisher Stilson Hutchins (1838–1912), the previous founder/owner of The Washington Post, 1877–1889. Purchased by Munsey in 1901, sold to Hearst in 1917, merged with Washington Herald in 1922, as Washington Times-Herald, acquired by Eleanor Josephine Medill Patterson ("Cissy" Patterson; 1881–1948) of Medill-McCormick-Patterson publishing families in 1939, to her death. Merged with The Washington Post in 1954. Times-Herald name remains on Post masthead until 1973 (not related to the later The Washington Times, published since 1982 by the subsidiary of the Unification Church and Rev. Sun Myung Moon, 1920–2012)
New York Daily News – operated 1901–1904; not the same Daily News later founded 1919 by Joseph Medill Patterson (1879–1946) of the Medill-McCormick-Patterson publishing families
The Boston Journal (1902; sold to Matthew Hale on March 10, 1913)
Baltimore News-American composed of Baltimore American [Sundays], (founded 1773), sold to Hearst by Gen. Felix Agnus, owner/publisher, 1923, and The News [week-days], founded 1873, acquired February 27, 1908, from owner/editor Charles H. Grasty (who bought it in 1892, who later became co-owner/editor of competitor Baltimore Sun), both News and American sold to Hearst, 1923 – later merged with the Baltimore Post of Scripps-Howard and both merged 1964, later closed 1986 after 113 years)
Philadelphia Evening Times (discontinued in 1914)
New York Herald – bought in 1920 along with the Paris Herald and the New York Evening Telegram, later the New York World-Telegram for four million dollars, sold in 1924 to Ogden Mills Reid, (grandson of elder Whitelaw, son of Whitelaw Reid (journalist)) who merged it with his own New York Tribune, founded in 1841 by Horace Greeley (1811–1872)
The New York Sun (historical) – purchased in 1916 and immediately merged with the "Press"; merged with the Herald in 1920 (not connected with later New York Sun published 2002–2008 with publisher Ronald Weintraub and editor Seth Lipsky)
New York Press (purchased in 1912; merged with the Sun in 1916)
The Mail
The New York Globe (bought and merged in the Sun in 1923)

The sale of the Herald in 1924 left Munsey owning only two newspapers before he died the following year. The Evening Telegram was sold to Scripps-Howard in 1927, two years after Munsey's death.

Other Munsey pulps and magazines included Puritan, Junior Munsey, All-Story Magazine, Scrap Book, Cavalier, Railroad and Current Mechanics.

Novels
Munsey also authored several novels:
Afloat in a Great City (1887)
The Boy Broker (1888)
A Tragedy of Errors (1889)
Under Fire (1890)
Derringforth (1894)

Banking
Munsey founded the Munsey Trust Company in 1913. It was re-organized in 1915 as The Equitable Trust Company with Munsey as chairman of the board, and became one of the city and state's dominant financial institutions into the late 20th century. It was purchased by Maryland National Bank in 1990.

Politics
Munsey became directly involved in presidential politics when former president Theodore Roosevelt announced his candidacy to challenge his hand-picked successor President William Taft for the landmark 1912 Republican Party nomination for the presidency. Munsey and George W. Perkins provided the financial backing for Roosevelt's campaign leading up to the Republican National Convention in Chicago. 

When Roosevelt and his supporters bolted from the convention, Munsey was one of the most outspoken critics of what were labeled as "corrupt proceedings" and announced that Roosevelt would run at the head of a new party. His encouragement and offer of financial backing led to the formation of the Progressive Party, which acquired the nickname of the "Bull Moose Party" (from TR's quotation that "I'm as strong as a bull moose", when questioned about his age after previously becoming the youngest president upon McKinley's assassination, serving almost two terms as president) then nominated Roosevelt for president. Munsey was one of its most ardent supporters and one of the largest contributors to its "third party" campaign expenses and pulled one of the largest votes ever for a candidate not from one of the two main dominant parties in American history.

Buildings
In 1905, Munsey built the Munsey Trust Building in downtown Washington, D.C. on 'F' Street, between 12th and 13th Streets next to the National Theatre, off Pennsylvania Avenue. Designed also by McKim, Mead and White of New York City with 13 floors, it was also one of the tallest structures in the Nation's Capital, besides the Washington Monument, the dome of the U.S. Capitol, the clock tower of the old Post Office headquarters further southeast on Pennsylvania Avenue, and various church spires. Headquarters of the Girl Scouts of the USA were located here from 1913-1916. It was torn down after extensive protests by historical preservationists and a court case in 1982.

Further to the northeast by forty miles, another tall skyscraper bears his name: The Munsey Building at the southeast corner of North Calvert and East Fayette Streets in downtown Baltimore across from the central Battle Monument Square. Rebuilt in 1911 by famous architectural firms of Baldwin & Pennington of Baltimore and McKim, Mead and White of New York City it was then briefly the city's tallest skyscraper and replaced an earlier newspaper headquarters building just built five years earlier after the Great Baltimore Fire of 1904, which was on the northern edge of the devastated downtown district.  Notable was the upstairs offices with the printing presses on the ground floor visible to passers-by through large department store-style display windows designed and built for "The News" of Baltimore.

Under Hearst's ownership, the paper moved again in 1924 to East Pratt Street between Commerce and South Streets (facing the old "Basin"/Inner Harbor piers), The Munsey Building was later renovated into an elaborate bank headquarters and customer service lobby of marble, brass and bronze for his Munsey Trust Company. In the early 2000s, after a series of bank mergers and out-of-town take-overs, the building was again transformed into apartments and condos with some commercial food and snack shops on the ground floor where the once grimy and oily printing presses had rumbled and rolled, replaced later by the ornate brass and marble counters for customer service with wood and paneling framed, glass-partitioned offices of the banking empire, but the name remained. Ironically, by 2013, a modern branch office of M&T Bank, an out-of-town corporate bank which also put its name on the city's pro football stadium for the Baltimore Ravens, opened on the first floor facing the ground level streets.

Death and legacy
Munsey died in New York City on December 22, 1925, from a burst appendix at age 71. In his will he made large bequests to his sister, nephew and niece, generous bequests to many cousins, and gifts and annuities to a large number of old acquaintances. He also bestowed large sums to 17 of his upper management employees, but nothing to the numerous employees who worked for him. Surprisingly, he bequeathed an annuity of $2000 to Annie Downs, a love interest of the young Munsey who "turned him down for marriage because she didn't think he was a good enough prospect for success." Munsey also contributed considerably to Bowdoin College, the Maine State Hospital at Portland, and Central Main General Hospital at Lewiston.

All the remainder of his fortune he gave to the Metropolitan Museum of Art on Fifth Avenue in New York City. This bequest included ownership of the Sun-Herald newspaper, The Mohican Stores grocery chain, and real estate holdings in Manhasset, New York, on the north shore of Long Island. Under the leadership of Museum President Robert W. DeForest, the Metropolitan Museum developed part of the land into a planned residential community called Munsey Park, New York. It featured Colonial-style houses and streets named after American artists. The community's first model home opened in 1928. By 1950 the Museum had sold the Munsey real estate interests to other developers, realizing an estimated four million dollars from these transactions.

At the time of his death his fortune was estimated to be $20 million to $40 million. Today with the rate of inflation it would be valued at $250 million to $500 million.

References

Sources and further reading
 Britt, George "Forty Years — Forty Millions, The Career of Frank A. Munsey". 1935. Farrar & Rinehart, Inc. Murray Hill, New York

 Chace, James. 1912: Wilson, Roosevelt, Taft & Debs — The Election That Changed the Country. New York: Simon & Schuster, 2004. 

 Cole, Marena. "A Progressive Conservative": The Roles of George Perkins and Frank Munsey in the Progressive Party Campaign of 1912" (PhD dissertation, Tufts University ProQuest Dissertations Publishing, 2017. 10273522).

 Garraty, John A. Right Hand Man: The Life of George W. Perkins, (1960) online

 Haining, Peter. The Fabulous Pulps. Vintage Books (a division of Random House), 1975. 

 Mowry, George E. Theodore Roosevelt and the Progressive Movement. (1946) focus on 1912

  Subtitles: Quarter of a Century Old : The Story of The Argosy, Our First Publication, and Incidentally the Story of Munsey's Magazine

External links 

 
 
 
 Debbie Rabina (2012) Changing Times: The Evolution of the New York Newspaper Industry
 Fact Monster People: Frank A. Munsey
 Encyclopædia Britannica: Frank Andrew Munsey
 "The Pulps" by Peter Haining
 ThePulp.Net's "A brief history of the pulp magazines" page
 Collecting Pulp Fiction article at AbeBooks.com.
 Pulpworld.com Munsey biography
 History of the Munsey Publishing Company, by Frank Munsey, published 1907, for the company's 25th anniversary
 Issue History
 Argosy and Railroad Man's Magazine
 
 
  (some as 'Frank A.', previous page of browse report)

1854 births
1925 deaths
American pulp magazine publishers (people)
19th-century American newspaper publishers (people)
American newspaper chain founders
American people of English descent
People from Mercer, Maine
People from Augusta, Maine
New York (state) Progressives (1912)
20th-century American politicians
Deaths from appendicitis
American bankers